The Balkhash minnow (Rhynchocypris poljakowii) is an Asian species of small freshwater cyprinid fish.

References

Rhynchocypris
Taxa named by Karl Kessler
Fish described in 1879